Alfio Contini (19 September 1927 – 23 March 2020) was an Italian cinematographer who collaborated with film directors such as Dino Risi (Il sorpasso, 1962; La marcia su Roma, 1963), Pasquale Festa Campanile (La matriarca, 1968), Lucio Fulci, Liliana Cavani (Galileo, 1968; The Night Porter 1974; Ripley's Game, 2002), and Michelangelo Antonioni (Zabriskie Point, 1970; Beyond the Clouds, 1995). In 1996, he won the David di Donatello for Best Cinematography award for his work on Beyond the Clouds.

References

External links
 

1927 births
Italian cinematographers
2020 deaths
David di Donatello winners